Amparo Iturbi Báguena (12 March 1898 – 22 April 1969) was a Spanish pianist.

Early career
Amparo Iturbi Báguena was born in Valencia, Spain, one of four children of Ricardo Iturbi (a piano tuner) and Teresa (Baguena) Iturbi.

The younger sister of José Iturbi, she gave her debut concert at age 15 in Barcelona. In 1925, she gave her first important concert outside Spain. She played in Paris, at the Salle Gaveau.

This was followed by dual piano recitals with José, touring Italy, Switzerland, Belgium, the Netherlands, and England. She accompanied the famous Catalan soprano Maria Barrientos. It was not until 1937 that she first played in the United States. She had one daughter, also named Amparo, by a brief marriage. The younger Amparo led an internationally renowned flamenco troupe and taught dance. Amparo Iturbi was a pioneer of the Spanish piano repertoire in the U.S., until the arrival of Alicia de Larrocha in 1965.

Film career

She had guest roles, playing herself, alongside her brother in the following MGM musicals:

 Two Girls and a Sailor (1944)
 Holiday in Mexico (1946)
 Three Daring Daughters (1948) 
 That Midnight Kiss (1949)

She was on the soundtrack of Three Daring Daughters (1948). Ámparo Iturbi appeared in films only long enough to play the piano with her brother. Known for their twin piano-playing, the pair appeared on The Jimmy Durante Show in 1955 and on The Bell Telephone Hour in 1962. There were many recordings released as a duo and singly. A CD, "Celebrated Artistry-Mozart/José & Ámparo Iturbi", was released in 1999.

Damehood
She was named a Dame of the Cross of the Order of Isabella the Catholic in 1958 in Spain.

Honorary scholarships
At California State University (Fresno), a special scholarship is available in Ámparo Iturbi's name.
José Iturbi established a scholarship fund in memory of his sister, whom he outlived by more than a decade, for music majors, particularly those specializing in piano at Loyola Marymount University.

Piano instructor
Amparo Iturbi gave piano lessons to selected students in the early 1950s from her home in Beverly Hills. Some students regarded her as somewhat "rigorous" due to the trademark Iturbi technique, which required that fingers be positioned at rest as harpsichord-like cocked hammers, waiting to strike down on the keys, touching fingertip only. Maintaining this position and executing a key strike without moving the adjacent fingers was mandatory and it was essential that the muscles and tendons of the forearm be "relaxed" at all times while playing. This near-counterintuitive technique was considered difficult or even painful by some pianists.

Madame Iturbi, as she was fondly called by her students, would sit closely to the piano bench, with her fingers squeezing lightly on the forearm of the pianist, so she could detect any tension in the arm and correct it when needed. This process could in itself bring on tension since Madame Iturbi's reactions could be quite dramatic and startling. Additionally, anything resembling a "flat finger" hand position was strictly forbidden, and relaxing into this ghastly sloppiness would bring on a little swat of the hand as a reminder.

Amparo was a fairly heavy cigarette smoker and would smoke continuously during piano lessons. Her students didn't appear to mind her smoking, however she had the notable habit of allowing the cigarette ash grow to a precarious length before tumbling on her clothes and/or the piano, which could be distracting to some students. Her colorful personality and storytelling made her a delightful and fascinating person to be around.

She had regular piano recitals at her home for the more advanced students and her brother would sometimes attend. Her rate was $25 per hour in the early 1950s, but she showed kindness and generosity to beginner students by offering them her "scholarship" for good achievement, whereby one free lesson was given for each one paid. Her students loved her dearly and some would invite her to dinner at their homes on a regular basis.

Death
Ámparo Iturbi died on 22 April 1969 in Beverly Hills, California, from a brain tumor, aged 71.

References

External links
 
 Biographical page at joseiturbi.com
 
Amparo Iturbu biography and discography at Naxos

 

1898 births
1969 deaths
Spanish classical pianists
Spanish women pianists
Classical piano duos
People from Valencia
Musicians from the Valencian Community
Deaths from brain cancer in the United States
Recipients of the Order of Isabella the Catholic
Women classical pianists
20th-century classical musicians
20th-century classical pianists
20th-century Spanish musicians
20th-century Spanish women
Burials at Holy Cross Cemetery, Culver City
20th-century women pianists